The Springfield Spirit was a women's professional basketball team in the National Women's Basketball League (NWBL). Based in the birthplace of basketball, Springfield, Massachusetts, the team played from 2002 to 2004.

External links
NWBL website (archive link)

Basketball teams in Springfield, Massachusetts
Basketball teams established in 2002
Basketball teams disestablished in 2004
2002 establishments in Massachusetts
2004 disestablishments in Massachusetts